Emaxwell Souza de Lima (born 11 February 1995), commonly known as Maxwell, is a Brazilian footballer who plays as a forward for Chapecoense.

Career
On 11 March 2019, Maxwell joined Allsvenskan side Kalmar on a four-and-a-half year deal.

Career statistics

Club

Notes

References

1995 births
Living people
Brazilian footballers
Brazilian expatriate footballers
Association football forwards
Clube de Regatas Brasil players
Red Bull Brasil players
Tupi Football Club players
ABC Futebol Clube players
Comercial Futebol Clube (Ribeirão Preto) players
Resende Futebol Clube players
Kalmar FF players
Cuiabá Esporte Clube players
Sport Club do Recife players
Campeonato Brasileiro Série B players
Campeonato Brasileiro Série C players
Allsvenskan players
Brazilian expatriate sportspeople in Sweden
Expatriate footballers in Sweden
People from Maceió
Sportspeople from Alagoas